The Quicksilver Meat Dream is the fourth album  by the Canadian alternative rock band I Mother Earth, released by Universal on April 8, 2003. It is allegedly a concept album, though the details on the concept are left to the fans.

The album retained the instrumental jams and cryptic lyrics of prior albums, but largely strayed from the band's psychedelic past. Instead, it offered a dark modern metal sound with industrial elements, and at times the band's greatest emphasis on progressive rock to date.

Personnel
Brian Byrne – vocals
Jagori Tanna – guitars, backing vocals
Bruce Gordon – bass
Christian Tanna – drums

Track listing
(All songs written by Jagori and Christian Tanna)

References

Footnotes
  EMI released Earth, Sky and Everything in Between, an album of B-sides and live recordings, against the band's wishes in 2001. It is technically the fourth I Mother Earth album though not considered part of the discography.

2003 albums
I Mother Earth albums
Albums produced by David Bottrill